The Sri Lankan cricket team toured South Africa during the 2000–01 season, playing three Tests and six one-day internationals.

Sri Lanka was led by Sanath Jayasuriya while South Africa was led by Shaun Pollock. The tour began with a Test series consisting of three matches. South Africa won two Test matches, winning the series 2–0, with one Test drawn. At the end of the series, Gary Kirsten of South Africa emerged as the top run-scorer with 266 runs, with an average of 88.66. Shaun Pollock and Muttiah Muralitharan finished the series as top wicket-takers capturing 13 and 12 wickets respectively. Pollock was named "man of the series".

One Day Internationals (ODIs)

1st ODI

2nd ODI

3rd ODI

4th ODI

5th ODI

6th ODI

Test series summary

1st Test

2nd Test

3rd Test

References

2000 in South African cricket
2000–01 South African cricket season
2000-01
International cricket competitions in 2000–01
2000 in Sri Lankan cricket